Fulay is a panchayat village in Gujarat, India. Administratively it is under Abdasa Taluka, Kutch District, Gujarat. Fulay is 19 km by road northwest of the town of Naliya.

Demographics 
In the 2001 census, the village of Fulay had 255 inhabitants, with 135 males (52.9%) and 120 females (47.1%), for a gender ratio of 889 females per thousand males.

Notes 

Villages in Kutch district